Mbale is a town in Kenya. It is the capital and largest town of Vihiga County. It is also called Maragoli, after the indigenous inhabitants of the area.

Location
The codinates of Mbale, Kenya are:0°04'54.0"N, 34°43'17.0"E (Latitude:0.081667; Longitude:34.721389).

Population
Mbale's population is estimated at about 60,000 people, of different races and ethnicities, which include the Luhya, Kikuyu, Kisii and Luo and Asians.

Overview
Mbale has five major hotels and four major bars that serve people from as far as Kisumu and Kakamega. Mbale has four major banks, namely Barclays Bank, Equity Bank, Co-operative Bank and KCB Bank Kenya Limited. It also has one Sacco bank, being Kakamega teachers Sacco society, which is yet to be officially launched but is functioning at the moment. Mbale has over a hundred small businesses such as shops, tailoring, bread distribution, cyber cafe services, healthcare services, construction, real estate, property mng and hotels. It is home to the annual Maragoli Cultural Festival, which is held every 26 December.

Schools
The town has nearly a dozen primary schools, including Hambale Primary School, Idavaga Muslim Primary School, Shalom Academy and Mukuli Primary School. The five secondary schools are Mbale High School, St. Clares Maragoli Secondary School, Kegoye Friends' Secondary School and Mbihi Secondary School. The former Vihiga County Governor, Moses Akaranga is an alumnus of Mbale High School.

Health
Mbale, Kenya is home to two hospitals; (a) Mbale Rural Provincial Health & Training Centre, and (b) Vihiga District Hospital

Religion
There are many places of worship in the town, including [ The Salvation Army Church]Anglican, Episcopal, African Israel Church Nineveh, Muslim and Roman Catholic and others.

References

External links
Maragoli Cultural Festival As of 26 December 2011.

Vihiga County
Populated places in Kenya
Cities in the Great Rift Valley
County capitals in Kenya